The Liberal Party (also translated as the Liberals' Party / Party of the Free) was an Iraqi political party that was founded in 1946. Tawfiq al-Suwaidi was elected as chairman. The party sought to reform the electoral system, consolidate democracy, improve representation, and reform and modernize the country's administration. The party had great influence in rural Iraq, and it allied with the National Democratic Party. It adopted a moderate stance and supported the Iraqi monarchy. It published the Liberals' Voice (Sawt al-Ahrar) newspaper.

References

1946 establishments in Iraq
1948 disestablishments in Iraq
Centrist parties in Asia
Defunct liberal political parties
Defunct political parties in Iraq
Liberal parties in Iraq
Organizations based in Baghdad
Political parties disestablished in 1948
Political parties established in 1946